Serenade to a Soul Sister is an album by jazz pianist Horace Silver released on the Blue Note label in 1968, featuring performances by Silver with Charles Tolliver, Stanley Turrentine, Bennie Maupin, Bob Cranshaw, John Williams, Mickey Roker and Billy Cobham.

The album was re-mastered, for the CD release in the 24-bit series, by Rudy Van Gelder, in 2004.

Silver's guidelines to musical composition 
The album's liner notes include Silver's guidelines to musical composition:

a. Melodic Beauty
b. Meaningful Simplicity
c. Harmonic Beauty
d. Rhythm
e. Environmental, Hereditary, Regional, and Spiritual Influences

Reception
AllMusic writer Steve Huey awarded the album 4½ stars and stated:

"One of the last great Horace Silver albums for Blue Note, Serenade to a Soul Sister is also one of the pianist's most infectiously cheerful, good-humored outings...  You'd never know this album was recorded in one of the most tumultuous years in American history, but as Silver says in the liner notes' indirect jab at the avant-garde, he simply didn't believe in allowing "politics, hatred, or anger" into his music. Whether you agree with that philosophy or not, it's hard to argue with musical results as joyous and tightly performed as Serenade to a Soul Sister."

Track listing
All compositions by Horace Silver.

 "Psychedelic Sally" – 7:14
 "Serenade to a Soul Sister" – 6:19
 "Rain Dance" – 6:21
 "Jungle Juice" – 6:46
 "Kindred Spirits" – 5:55
 "Next Time I Fall in Love" – 5:19

Personnel

Musicians
on tracks 1 – 3 (February 23, 1968)

Horace Silver – piano
Charles Tolliver – trumpet
Stanley Turrentine – tenor saxophone
Bob Cranshaw – bass, electric bass (on track 1)
Mickey Roker – drums

on tracks 4 – 6 (March 29, 1968)
Horace Silver – piano
Charles Tolliver – trumpet (exc. track 6)
Bennie Maupin – tenor saxophone (exc. track 6)
John Williams – bass
Billy Cobham – drums

Production
 Alfred Lion – production
 Rudy Van Gelder – engineering
 Reid Miles – design
 Billy Cobham (Cover), Francis Wolff (Interior) – photography

References

Horace Silver albums
1968 albums
Blue Note Records albums
Albums produced by Alfred Lion
Albums recorded at Van Gelder Studio
Albums with cover art by Reid Miles